Oriane Bertone (born March 10, 2005 in Nice) is a French rock climber, sport climber and boulderer. In 2018, when she was 12 years old, Bertone became the youngest climber to send a  boulder problem. In 2019 she started competing in international youth sport climbing events where she won multiple gold medals in both lead climbing and bouldering. In April 2021, Bertone made her senior International Federation of Sport Climbing (IFSC) competition debut at age 16 at the Boulder World Cup in Meiringen, where she advanced to the final and placed second.

Rankings

European youth championship

Youth world championships

European championships

IFSC World Cup

Podiums

Notable ascents

Boulder problems 

:
 Satan I Helvete - Bas, Fontainebleau (France) - 2020 

:
 Golden Shadow - Rocklands (South Africa) - 2018 
 Super Tanker - Fontainebleau (France) - 2021 

:
 Psychopad - Réunion - 2017
 Le Spartiate direct assis - Réunion - 2018
 Fragile Steps - RockLands (South Africa) - 2017
 Trafic - Fontainebleau - 2018
 The master Key - Rocklands (South Africa) - 2019
 Bio Affinity - Rocklands (South Africa) - 2019
 Ray of light - Rocklands (South Africa) - 2020
 Leopard cave extended - Rocklands (South Africa) - 2020
 Agamemnon - Rocklands (South Africa) - 2020
 Fata I Helvete - Fontainebleau - 2020

Redpointed routes 

:
 Panonoramix et les cyclopes - Saint Léger - 2020
:
 Chykungunya - Réunion - 2018
 Stay Kratom, stay home - Saint Léger - 2020
 Panonoramix - Saint Léger - 2020

References 

French rock climbers

2005 births
Living people
Female climbers
Sportspeople from Nice
Competitors at the 2022 World Games
IFSC Climbing World Cup overall medalists
Boulder climbers